The Rang community (also spelled 'Rung' community) are a Tibeto-Burman ethnic group dwelling historically in the upper parts of the Johar, Darma, and Mahakali valleys in India and Nepal. Some of them live in the Chameylia valley of Nepal. In Nepal and in the Johar valley of India, they are also known as the Shauka; sometimes, the Rungbas of the Mahakali and Darma valleys also prefer being called 'Shauka'. The Rang/Shauka community traditionally practices transhumance. The community is listed as indigenous tribe in India and Nepal. Historically, the Rung/Shauka community had Trans-Himalayan trade ties with partner traders in western Tibet. Their traditional lifestyle included annual cycles of transhumance between lower, winter settlements, and upper, summer settlements higher up in the tributary valleys of the Mahakali river. During these cycles of transhumance, some of them would continue further north with merchandise to trade in the seasonal trade marts of western Tibet, laden on long lines of goats and sheep. Some would stay back in the upper villages, practising agriculture. A few others would practice nomadic pastoralism. However, following the Sino-Indian War of 1962, the Trans-Himalayan trade came to an abrupt halt. It was resumed in the 1990s under more state-regulated conditions and regulations. Pastoralism declined over the decades in significance too, as a means of livelihood among the Rung. These old livelihoods were to a significant degree replaced by medicinal herb collecting, and migrating to towns and cities for education and to look for jobs.  

They  speak three kinds of Tibeto-Burman languages - Byansi, Chaudangsi and Darma.

References

Indigenous peoples of Nepal
Ethnic groups in India
Ethnic groups in Nepal